The Ofanto, known in ancient times as Aufidus or Canna, is a  river in southern Italy that flows through the regions of Campania, Basilicata, and Apulia, into the Gulf of Manfredonia near Barletta.

Geography
From there it runs southeast near Lioni before flowing into Lago di Conza, an artificial lake. The river then forms the border between the province of Avellino and the province of Potenza except for a small extension of the province of Avellino near Calitri. The Atella flows into the Ofanto near this point as a right tributary of the river. The river curves north and flows near Monteverde before forming the border between the province of Foggia and the province of Potenza. It then curves east for a distance and a right tributary, the Olivento, flows into it in this area. The river curves northeast and then forms the border between the province of Foggia and the province of Barletta-Andria-Trani. The river flows near Posta Piana, Canosa di Puglia, San Ferdinando di Puglia, and Cannae before entering the Gulf of Manfredonia between Margherita di Savoia and Barletta. The Locone enters the Ofanto south of Cerignola as a right tributary of the river. At the end of its journey to the sea, the river ends in a delta and an estuary.

The River Ofanto can have a torrential flow at times, with major floods along its course in the autumn and winter, thanks to heavy rainfall, but in the summer its flow can be remarkably slight.

Gallery

References

Adriatic Italian coast basins
Rivers of the Province of Avellino
Rivers of the Province of Potenza
Rivers of the Province of Foggia
Rivers of the Province of Barletta-Andria-Trani
Rivers of Italy